Hipoepa fractalis is a species of moth of the family Noctuidae first described by Achille Guenée in 1854. It is found in Taiwan, China, Japan, Kenya, Korea, India, Malaysia, Nigeria, Indonesia, the Philippines, Thailand, Cape Verde, Réunion, Saudi Arabia, South Africa, Sri Lanka, Uganda, Yemen and Australia (including Queensland).

Description
The wingspan is 19–34 mm. Antennae of male not knotted and contorted nor serrate. A reddish-brown moth. Forewings with postmedial line more waved and crenulate. The submarginal line angled below costa and at middle.

References

Herminiinae
Moths described in 1854
Owlet moths of Africa
Moths of Cape Verde
Moths of Asia
Moths of Japan
Moths of the Philippines
Moths of the Middle East
Moths of Africa